The Master Race is a 1944 American drama film directed by Herbert Biberman and written by Biberman, Anne Froelich and Rowland Leigh. The film stars George Coulouris, Stanley Ridges, Osa Massen, Carl Esmond, Nancy Gates, Morris Carnovsky, Lloyd Bridges, Helen Beverly, Gavin Muir and Paul Guilfoyle. The film was released on October 18, 1944, by RKO Pictures.

Plot
As the Nazis come to realise that their dreams of world domination after World War II will not be fulfilled and that Germany is in fact about to be defeated, a fanatical hard core prepare for the future Fourth Reich and the continuation of the dream of Aryan supremacy in later generations. To this end, Nazi officer von Beck is sent to infiltrate a village in rural Belgium where he will wait to agitate again for racial supremacy for "true Europeans" over lesser, "mongrel" races.

Cast
George Coulouris as Von Beck
Stanley Ridges as Phil Carson
Osa Massen as Helena
Carl Esmond as Andrei
Nancy Gates as Nina
Morris Carnovsky as Old Man Bartoc
Lloyd Bridges as Frank
Eric Feldary as Altmeier
Helen Beverly as Mrs. Varin
Gavin Muir as William Forsythe
Paul Guilfoyle as Katry
Richard Aherne as Sergeant O'Farrell 
Ludwig Donath as Schmidt 
Herbert Rudley as John
Gigi Perreau as Bab

References

External links
 

1944 films
American black-and-white films
RKO Pictures films
Films scored by Roy Webb
Films directed by Herbert Biberman
1944 drama films
American drama films
1940s English-language films
1940s American films